Pargui Emile Paré is a Burkinabé politician and member of the People's Movement for Socialism/Federal Party (MPS/FP).

Running as candidate of the Socialist Alliance, a coalition of the MPS/FP and Unified Socialist Party (PSU). In the 13 November 2005 elections, Paré placed 10th out of 13 candidates, receiving 0.87% of the vote. Paré has also been announced as a candidate in the 2010 presidential election.

Paré ran again for president in 2010, against incumbent Blaise Compaore.

He is a member of the opposition People's Movement for Progress (MPP), and has called the 2014 Burkinabé uprising the "Black Spring".

References 

Burkinabé politicians
Living people
Year of birth missing (living people)
Burkinabé socialists
21st-century Burkinabé people